Xylecata glauce is a moth of the family Erebidae. It is found in Kenya and Uganda.

References

Nyctemerina
Moths described in 1916